Brydan Klein was the defending champion, but he lost in the first round 2–6, 6–1, 4–6, against Kittipong Wachiramanowong.
Bernard Tomic won in the final 6–4, 6–2 against Greg Jones.

Seeds

Draw

Finals

Top half

Bottom half

External links
Main Draw
Qualifying Draw

McDonald's Burnie International - Singles
2010 Singles
2010 in Australian tennis